Maksim Yevgenyevich Povorov (born 17 September 1977) is a Russian former footballer.

External links
  Player page on the official FC Ural website

1977 births
Footballers from Moscow
Living people
Russian footballers
Russia under-21 international footballers
Association football defenders
FC Dynamo Moscow players
FC Fakel Voronezh players
FC Amkar Perm players
FC Ural Yekaterinburg players
FC Shinnik Yaroslavl players
Russian Premier League players
FC Kristall Smolensk players
FC Olimp-Dolgoprudny players